The 2021–22 Serbian SuperLiga (known as the Linglong Tire SuperLiga for sponsorship reasons) was the 16th season of the Serbian SuperLiga since its establishment in 2006. Red Star were the defending champions, having won their 7th SuperLiga and 32nd domestic title in the previous season.
Start and end dates, fixtures and competition format were released on 22 June 2021.

Summary 
Number of teams in the league for this season was reduced from 20 to 16 from last season which had increased number of teams due to COVID-19 pandemic. Before the start of the season, on 16 June 2021, it was announced that number of teams in the league will again be reduced at the end of season - this time to 14. Because of that 4 teams will be relegated while only 2 will be promoted from Serbian First League. Rule about bonus players was also changed for this season - each team now must have at least one player born in 2000 or younger in the squad for the duration of entire match. 

Decision about decreasing number of teams for a next season was revised on 6 July 2021 when Football Association of Serbia decided that number of teams in top flight will remain 16. Format was officially reverted to the one used in 19–20 season - each time will play each other twice in round-robin format after which top half will play in Championship round and bottom half in Relegation-round play-offs. Last two teams from Relegation round will be relegated while teams finishing 13th and 14th will play Relegations play-off against teams who finished 3rd and 4th in Serbian First League. Rule about foreign players registration was also changed. Instead of maximum of 4 foreign players in match protocol teams can now have unlimited number of foreign players with maximum of 4 at the pitch at any time. For the first time in Serbian SuperLiga history Video assistant referee will be used on all matches.

This season marked the start of a new three-year TV deal. Deal was signed with Telekom Srbija and their subsidiary Arena Channels Group. They will pay 3 million-a-year for the next three seasons, a record breaking deal for Serbian SuperLiga.

Impact of COVID-19 pandemic 
At the start of this season it was announced that, for the first time since 2019–20 season, attendance will be allowed for all matches. With limitation that no more than 50% of maximum capacity can be filled.

Teams 

Sixteen teams will compete in the league, the top 14 from previous season and two teams promoted from Serbian First League. Promoted teams were Radnički 1923 who return to the top flight after a six years absence and Kolubara who are promoted to the SuperLiga for the first time in their history. They will replace Javor, Rad, Bačka, Inđija, Mačva and Zlatibor.

Venues

Personnel, Kits and General sponsor

Note: Flags indicate national team as has been defined under FIFA eligibility rules. Players and Managers may hold more than one non-FIFA nationality.

Nike is the official ball supplier for Serbian SuperLiga.

Kelme is the official sponsor of the Referee's Committee of the Football Association of Serbia.

Managerial changes

Regular season

League table

Results

Play-offs

Championship round 
The top eight teams advanced from the regular season. Teams played each other once.

League table

Relegation round 
The bottom eight teams from the regular season play in the relegation round. Teams play each other once.

League table

Relegations play-off
Two legged relegation play-off matches will be played between the teams placed 13th and 14th at the end of relegation round and the teams placed 3rd and 4th at the end of Serbian First League Promotion round.

First legs

Second legs

Individual statistics

Top goalscorers
As of matches played on 22 May 2022.

Hat-tricks

Player of the week
As of matches played on 22 May 2022.

References

External links
 
 UEFA

Serbia
Serbian SuperLiga seasons
2021–22 in Serbian football leagues